Sándor Molnár (born 29 June 1994) is a Hungarian professional footballer who plays for Komárom VSE.

Club statistics

Updated to games played as of 4 August 2013.

References

External links

HLSZ

1994 births
Living people
Footballers from Budapest
Hungarian footballers
Association football defenders
Újpest FC players
BKV Előre SC footballers
FC Dabas footballers
Nemzeti Bajnokság I players
Nemzeti Bajnokság II players